David Hubáček (born 23 February 1977) is a former Czech professional footballer who currently plays for FC Fastav Zlín.

He won the Gambrinus liga titles with Slavia Prague in 2008 and 2009.

External links
 Profile at iDNES.cz
 Guardian Football

1977 births
Living people
Czech footballers
Czech First League players
Association football defenders
SK Slavia Prague players
Sportspeople from Zlín
FC Fastav Zlín players